Divers Lake is a lake on Vancouver Island, British Columbia, Canada on the north side of Forbidden Plateau in Strathcona Provincial Park.

See also
List of lakes of British Columbia

References

Alberni Valley
Lakes of Vancouver Island
Comox Land District